Upendra Bikram Shah (sometimes known as Mahila Sahibju) was a Nepalese prince.

Biography 
Upendra Bikram Shah was born in Hanuman Dhoka to King Rajendra Bikram Shah and Maharani Samrajya Lakshmi Devi. His mother is sometimes called the one of the most powerful queens in the history of Nepal.

Shah was sent into Allahabad, British India for conspiring against Jung Bahadur Rana.

In 1854, Shah was given the Bagh Durbar, where, he was later put under house arrest for treason.

He died in Bikram Sambat 1896. Upendra Bikram Shah was also a Tantrik.

References 

19th-century Nepalese nobility
Nepalese Hindus
Nepalese princes
Nepalese prisoners and detainees
Prisoners and detainees of Nepal
People from Kathmandu
People convicted of treason